Die Vecna Die! is an Advanced Dungeons & Dragons (AD&D 2nd edition) module released in 2000 by Wizards of the Coast.  The module is divided into three sections, each taking part in a different campaign setting: Greyhawk, Ravenloft, and Planescape.  It was one of the last official adventures released for the 2nd edition of Dungeons & Dragons.

Plot summary
This adventure, and Vecna's multiverse-shattering plan contained within it, have been used by some D&D fans as an in-game explanation of the differences between the 2nd and 3rd editions of Dungeons & Dragons. The closing paragraph of the module reads as follows:

"Even with Vecna's removal, his time in the crux effected change in superspace. Though the Lady of Pain attempts to heal the damage, the turmoil spawned by Vecna's time in Sigil cannot be entirely erased. Some Outer Planes drift off and are forever lost, others collide and merge, while at least one Inner Plane runs "aground" on a distant world of the Prime. Moreover, the very nature of the Prime Material Plane itself is altered. Half-worlds like those attached to Tovag Baragu multiply a millionfold, taking on parallel realism in what was before a unified Prime Material Plane. The concept of alternate dimensions rears its metaphorical head, but doesn't yet solidify, and perhaps it never will. New realms, both near and far, are revealed and realms never previously imagined make themselves known. Entities long thought lost emerge once more, while other creatures, both great and small, are inexplicably eradicated. Some common spells begin to work differently. The changes do not occur immediately, but instead are revealed during the subsequent months. However, one thing remains clear: Nothing will ever be the same again."

Publication history
Die Vecna Die! was written by Bruce Cordell and Steve Miller, with cover art by Paul Bonner and interior art by Kevin McCann. It is a 160-page softcover book designed for four to six characters of levels 10 to 13.

Reception
Shannon Appelcline comments that for the end of the Advanced Dungeons & Dragons line, Wizards produced Die Vecna Die! as

In 2013, Alex Lucard, for Diehard GameFAN, wrote:

References

External links
Die Vecna Die! at TSR Archive

Greyhawk modules
Planescape
Ravenloft
Role-playing game supplements introduced in 2000